Ludwig IX may refer to:

 Louis IX, Duke of Bavaria (1417–1479)
 Louis IX, Landgrave of Hesse-Darmstadt (1719–1790)